Jews Without Money is a 1930 semi-autobiographical novel by American critic Mike Gold.

Description
Published by Horace Liveright shortly after the onset of the Great Depression, the novel is a fictionalized autobiography about growing up in the impoverished world of the Lower East Side, beginning in the 1890s.  Jews without Money was an immediate success and was reprinted 25 times by 1950. It was translated into 16 languages. It became a prototype for the American proletarian novel.

Jews without Money is set in a slum populated mainly by Jewish immigrants from Eastern Europe. The father of the hero is a painter who suffers from lead poisoning. When he falls from a scaffold, he is disabled and can no longer work. His business fails and the family is pushed into poverty. The mother has to seek work in a restaurant. Although he is a bright boy, young Michael decides he must leave school. On the final page of the book, the poor Jewish boy prays for the arrival of a Marxist worker's revolution that will emancipate the working class.

In his authorial note to the novel, Gold wrote, "I have told in my book a tale of Jewish poverty in one ghetto, that of New York.  The same story can be of a hundred other ghettoes scattered over all the world.  For centuries the Jew has lived in this universal ghetto."

See also
 Mike Gold
 Jewish-American working class
 Proletarian literature
 Alan M. Wald

References

1930 American novels
American autobiographical novels
Ashkenazi Jewish culture in New York City
Disability literature
Jewish American novels
Jewish socialism
Lower East Side
Proletarian literature
Novels set in New York City
Romanian-Jewish culture in New York (state)
Socialism in the United States
Working-class culture in New York City